The New Territories West geographical constituency was one of the geographical constituencies in the Legislative Council of Hong Kong from 1998 to 2021. It was established in 1998 for the first SAR Legislative Council election and was abolished under the 2021 overhaul of the Hong Kong electoral system. Located in the western part of the New Territories, it was the largest geographical constituency in Hong Kong with 1,308,081 electorates in 2020. It consisted of Tsuen Wan District, Kwai Tsing District, Tuen Mun District, Yuen Long District and Islands District. In the 2016 Legislative Council election, it elected nine members of the Legislative Council using the Hare quota of party-list proportional representation.

History

The single-constituency single-vote system was replaced by the party-list proportional representation system for the first SAR Legislative Council election designed by Beijing to reward the weaker pro-Beijing candidates and dilute the electoral strength of the majority pro-democrats. Five seats were allocated to New Territories West, where the pro-democrats took four of the seats with one seat went to Tam Yiu-chung of the pro-Beijing Democratic Alliance for the Betterment of Hong Kong (DAB) with nearly one-fifth of the popular vote. Pro-grassroots democrats Lee Cheuk-yan of the Hong Kong Confederation of Trade Unions (CTU) and Leung Yiu-chung of the Neighbourhood and Worker's Service Centre (NWSC) each won a seat, with pro-democracy flagship party Democratic Party took two seats with Lee Wing-tat and Albert Ho being elected.

One extra seat was added to the constituency in the 2000 Legislative Council election, where the Democratic Party split their tickets into three in order to maximise its chance to win one more seat, due to the unique design of the Hare quota of the party-list proportional representation. Different zones were set up for each ticket to gather their votes, Kwai Tsing and Islands Districts for Lee Wing-tat, Tuen Mun and rural Yueng Long for Albert Ho and Tsuen Wan, Yuen Long Town Centre, Tin Shui Wai and a small part of Tuen Mun for Albert Chan. With the rural support of the DAB–PA joint ticket, Tang Siu-tong was able to beat the Democratic tickets to gain the extra seat at the expense of Lee Wing-tat who lost the re-election.

In the 2004 Legislative Council election, the number of seats in New Territories West was increased to eight, where the two new seats were taken by Lee Wing-tat who came back from his loss, and Selina Chow of the Liberal Party who rode on the popularity gained from the party's opposition 2003 Basic Law Article 23 legislation. Selina Chow lost her 2008 re-election which she complained the rural votes were taken away by DAB's rural candidate Cheung Hok-ming. Chow was replaced by veteran trade unionist Wong Kwok-hing of the Hong Kong Federation of Trade Unions (FTU).

In 2010, Albert Chan of the League of Social Democrats (LSD) resigned from the office to rigger a by-election as a de facto referendum on the government's constitutional reform proposal. Chan was re-elected with a low turnout due to the government and pro-Beijing boycott.

The deal on the modified constitutional reform proposal struck by the moderate democrats and the Beijing authorities expanded the number of the geographical constituency seats from 30 to 35, where the seats in New Territories West were increased to nine. The DAB deployed an offensive strategy by splitting their ticket into three separate ones, led by Tam Yiu-chung, Leung Che-cheung and Chan Han-pan respectively. All three DAB tickets were elected, taking the advantage on the miscalculation of the pro-democrats, where the Civic Party took a overly aggressive strategy by fielding Kwok Ka-ki and Audrey Eu on the same ticket , hoping to win two seats. As a result, the Civics failed to get Eu elected and wasted votes at the expense on the Democratic Party who saw Lee Wing-tat and Josephine Chan both failed to win a seat. With Michael Tien of the New People's Party (NPP) also won a seat and Alice Mak retained a seat for the FTU, the pro-Beijing camp achieved a majority in New Territories West for the first time by winning five seats compared to pro-democrats' four.

The pro-Beijing camp retained its majority in the 2016 Legislative Council election, as the pro-democrats again split their votes in the overcrowding field. Localists Eddie Chu and Civic Passion's Cheng Chung-tai were elected with high votes among the opposition candidate, while Civic Kwok Ka-ki and Democrat Andrew Wan took the two other seats. Veteran Lee Cheuk-yan of the Labour Party was unexpectedly defeated by pro-Beijing independent Junius Ho with a margin of 0.91 percentage point, who took Tam Yiu-chung's place who was retiring.

Members returned
Below are all the members since the creation of the New Territories West constituency. The number of seats allocated to New Territories has been increased from five to nine between 1998 and 2012 due to the enlargement.

Summary of seats won

Vote share summary

Election results
The largest remainder method (with Hare quota) of the proportional representative electoral system was introduced in 1998, replacing the single-member constituencies of the 1995 election. Elected candidates are shown in bold. Brackets indicate the quota + remainder.

2010s

2000s

1990s

See also 
 List of constituencies of Hong Kong

References

Constituencies of Hong Kong
New Territories
Constituencies of Hong Kong Legislative Council
1998 establishments in Hong Kong
Constituencies established in 1998
2021 disestablishments in Hong Kong
Constituencies disestablished in 2021